Bharathi Kannamma 2 is a 2023 Indian Tamil-language drama television series produced by Global Villagers and directed by Praveen Bennett. A spin-off series of Bharathi Kannamma, it stars Vinusha Devi and Sibbu Suryan. Along with Roopa Sree and Deepa Shankar in the supporting roles. While, Actress Reshma Muralidharan made a cameo appearance as Kannamma.

It premiered on Star Vijay on 6 February 2023 From Monday to Saturday at 21:00 and is also available on the digital platform on Disney+ Hotstar.

Cast

Main
 Vinusha Devi as Chitra  alias "Kannamma" (2023- present)
 Reshma Muralidharan as Real "Kannamma" (Dead) (Cameo) (2023)
 Sibbu Suryan as Bharathi (2023-present)

Supporting
 Farina Azad as Venba
 Roopa Sree as Soundarya
 Deepa Shankar as Baakiya 
 Radha as Sharmila
 Guhan Shanmugam as Vijay
 Udumalai Ravi as Selvam 
 Baby George
 Anuradha Krishnamoorthy as N. Nandini
 Reshma Prasad as Madhu
 Priyanka Dass / Sai Rithu as Anjali
 VJ Annamalai as Akilan
 Shathiga as Shanthi

Special appearances 
 Lisha Rajkumar as young Kannamma
 Samyutha as young Anjali
 Sherin as young Venba
 Sahasraa as young Madhu
 Aneesha as young Shanthi

Production
The first promo was released on 3 February 2023.

Casting
The second season stars Vinusha Devi, who played Kannamma in the first season, was also play in the second season of this series.  Roja fame Sibbu Suryan was cast as Bharathi. Roopa Sree reprised her role as Bhrathi's Mother from Bharathi Kannamma making her comeback.

References

External links
 Bharathi Kannamma 2 at Hotstar
 

Star Vijay original programming
Tamil-language romance television series
Tamil-language melodrama television series
2023 Tamil-language television series debuts
Tamil-language television soap operas
Tamil-language sequel television series
Television shows set in Tamil Nadu
Tamil-language television shows